Maharashtra attracts tourists from other Indian states and foreign countries. It was the  second most visited Indian state by foreigners and fifth most visited state by domestic tourists in the country in 2021. Aurangabad is the tourism capital of Maharashtra.

Metropolitan Areas

Mumbai
The city is the eastern equivalent of New York City and Los Angeles, the financial capital and entertainment (Bollywood) capital of the country. Places of interest include: Gateway of India, The Bandra-Worli Sea Link, Chhatrapati Shivaji Maharaj Vastu Sangrahalaya, Chatrapati Shivaji Terminus, a humongous architectural stone structure built by the British more than 200 years ago, Downtown Mumbai - reminiscent of the 19th century British architecture. Girgaon Chowpatty beach, Madh Island beach and other beaches towards the south of Mumbai. Elephanta Caves, carved out of a giant stone on an island are a short ferry away into the Arabian Sea. Siddhivinayak Temple, Mumbai is one of the most popular temple of Ganesha in Mumbai. Along with being a religious place, it is a great attraction for tourists. 
Due to its cosmopolitan nature, Mumbai has proven a popular tourism destination most often visited by Indians.

Nashik
The city is famous for its Nashik grape and Vineyards. It is known as "The Wine Capital of India" owing to 22 wineries being located here out of a total of 46 throughout India. Several wine festivals and wine tasting tours are held in this region. Nashik is also surrounded by various forts and hills and has an abundance of hiking trails.

A 108 feet tall statue of the first Jain Tirthankar Rishabhanatha  was consecrated at Mangi Tungi in 2016, which is the tallest Jain statue in the world. The place has now become a major pilgrimage and tourist destination in the state.

The city also has a lot of religious and mythological significance. Lord Rama lived in Panchavati during his exile as mentioned in the epic Ramayana. It is famous for its numerous temples like Kalaram Temple, Trimbakeshwar Temple - one of the 12 Jyotirlingas. The river Godavari River, also known as the Ganga of the South, originates from the Brahmagiri Hills in Trimbakeshwar. The Nashik-Trimbakeshwar Simhastha is one of the four Kumbh Melas held every 12 years in Nashik.

Pune
Pune district has been at the center of History of Maharashtra for more than four hundred years, beginning with the Deccan sultanates and followed by the Maratha Empire. The district has a number of mountain forts and buildings from these eras, in addition to shrines revered by Marathi Hindus (including five of the eight Ashtavinayaka Ganesha temples). Samadhis of the two most revered Marathi Bhakti saints (Dnyaneshwar and Tukaram) are in Alandi and Dehu, respectively. The main temple of Khandoba, the family deity for most Marathi Hindus, is in Jejuri.

The British designated Pune as the monsoon capital of the Bombay Presidency, and many buildings and parks from the era remain. Hill stations such as Lonavla and Khandala also date back to the Raj, and remain popular with residents of Pune and Mumbai for holidays. The Western part of Pune district is dotted with the ruins of many mountain forts from Deccan Sultanate and the Maratha empire eras respectively. These forts and the surrounding hills with forests are popular with people interested in trekking, hiking and Heritage tourism.

An area of about  has become a sanctuary for migratory birds.

In January 2021, the prison department of Maharashtra announced jail Tourism at the Yerawada jail where Indian independence activists  like M.K Gandhi, Bal Gangadhar Tilak, Vallabhbhai Patel Subhashchandra Bose, Sarojini Naidu, Jawaharlal Nehru were imprisoned. The visitor number to the prison will initially be capped at 50 per day.

Aurangabad 

This citys also known as Aurangabad, in the central part of Maharashtra and attracts tourists for its natural beauty. The Ajanta Caves and Ellora Caves, that lie on the outskirts of Aurangabad are internationally renowned for man-made caves and intricate carvings in them. Ajanta and Ellora Caves are UNESCO World Heritage sites. Ellora is notable for having a unique monolithic vertically excavated building known as Kailasa temple, Ellora and Ajanta Caves is notably for Lord Buddha in stone. Ancient Buddhist life has been depicted in the delicate stonework. While Ajanta is completely Buddhist caves, Ellora caves belong to Buddhism, Hinduism, and Jainism. Summers are not advisable for touring as temperatures can reach up to and above 44 degrees C during the day. There are other famous places of interest like Bibi Ka Maqbara (The Taj Mahal of Deccan), Daulatabad Fort, Panchakki, Sunheri Mahal, etc. Aurangabad has good connectivity by air, road, and railways.

Aurangabad is the tourism capital of Maharashtra.

Nagpur 

With a tradition of producing the best Oranges, Nagpur city is known as the City of Oranges. Nagpur is also known as the second greenest city in India due to a number of trees in the city. The tourism in Nagpur is due to a large number of National Parks/Wildlife Sanctuaries surrounding Nagpur. All of these sanctuaries have Tiger as their major attractions. Two notable National Parks around Nagpur are Pench National Park around 60 km north of Nagpur, and Tadoba National Park around 180  km south of Nagpur. In recent years, Tadoba National Park gained much importance among wildlife enthusiasts nationally and internationally due to the high probability of sighting Tigers. The other wildlife sanctuaries include Nagzira Wildlife Sanctuary around 110 km east of Nagpur, Melghat Tiger Reserve around 260 km west of Nagpur, Umred Karhandla Wildlife Sanctuary 60 km southeast of Nagpur, Bor Wildlife Sanctuary 60 km southwest of Nagpur, Kanha National Park 260 km northeast of Nagpur, Satpura National Park 270 km northwest of Nagpur.

Beside these Nagpur has much historical significance. Deekshabhoomi - the place where Dr. Babasaheb Ambedkar and lakhs of the so-called lower caste who deemed as untouchables by Hindu caste system, embraced Buddhism. Another important place to visit is Tekadi Ganesh mandir on Sitabuildi fort complex. The city has other places of tourist importance such as Maharajbagh zoo, and Futala lake Chowpati, Nagpur is well connected with all major cities of India by roadways and railways, and also have an international airport. Dr. Babasaheb Ambedkar International Airport (IATA: NAG, ICAO: VANP) is an international airport serving the city of Nagpur, Maharashtra, India. In 2005, it was named after B. R. Ambedkar, the chief architect of the Indian Constitution.

Satara 

Satara lies on the western part of Maharashtra. It is known for tourist places like Mahabaleshwar, Wai, Panchgani and rivers such as Koyna and Krishna. Mahabaleshwar and Panchgani are one of the famous tourist places in India. Krishna originates at Mahabaleswar near the Jor village in the extreme north of Wai district. The Kaas plateau is also one of the most popular tourist attractions in Satara. This plateau falls under the Sahyadri Sub Cluster of Western Ghats which is now a UNESCO World Heritage Site.

Nature tourism 
Maharashtra has tremendous potential for Nature Tourism. Many private and public organizations have begun unique and innovative forms of nature tourism.

Hill stations

During the colonial rule, the British developed many hill stations throughout India and in Maharashtra to escape the heat during the summer months. Most of these are located on the hills of the Sahyadri range of the Western Ghats and close to the largest metropolitan areas in state, namely Mumbai and Pune. Chikhaldara and Toranmal are two places that are located on the Satpura range which runs east to west on the border between Maharashtra and Madhya Pradesh. Popular colonial era hill stations in the state include
 Amboli 
 Chikhaldara - in Satpura mountains
 Igatpuri - On Main Mumbai - Bhusawal railway line
 Jawhar
 Karjat - On Main Mumbai - Pune railway line
 Khandala - On Main Mumbai - Pune railway line
 Lonavala - On Main Mumbai - Pune railway line
 Mahabaleshwar - Summer capital of Bombay presidency during the British Raj
 Matheran - linked to the main Mumbai - Pune railway line with a narrow gauge mountain train.
 Panchgani - Close neighbour of Mahabaleshwar with many colonial-era boarding schools.
 Panhala 
 Toranmal

Lavasa is a very recently developed township and is under private control.

Religious Tourism 

Maharashtra boasts of a large number of popular and revered religious venues that are heavily frequented by locals as well as out-of-state visitors.

Hindu places of pilgrimage
Vithoba temple, Pandharpur is the main center of worship for the Hindu deity Vithoba, believed to be a local form of god Krishna or Vishnu and his consort Rakhumai. They are the most visited temples in Maharashtra. Vithoba devotees called Varkaris start marching from the resting places of Varkari saints from different regions of Maharashtra to Pandharpur in huge processions to reach the place on Aashadhi ekadashi and Kartiki Ekadashi.

Shegaon, resting place of Gajanan Maharaj, the late 19th/early 20th-century religious figure 
Akkalkot, Temple /Matha dedicated to 19th century Swami Samarth.
Shirdi, temple of Sai Baba - a hugely revered saint from late 19th/early 20th century with global following. 
Tuljapur, Temple of Goddess Bhavani 
Kolhapur, Temple of Goddess Mahalaxmi or Ambabai
Mumbai, Temple of Siddhivinayak Temple, Mumbai
Mumbai, Mahalakshmi temple in south Mumbai
Shani Shingnapur, Temple of God Shani (Shanidev)
Ashtavinayaka, 8 Abodes of Lord Ganesha
Ambajogai -Temple of Yogeshwari, one of the 3 1/2 Shaktipeethas in the state.

Other religions and sects

Mumbai, Haji Ali Dargah, a popular mosque built in the sea off the coast of Worli, 
Mumbai, Mount Mary church in the suburb of Bandra
Nanded, Hazur Sahib Nanded Gurudwara, the resting place of Sikh Guru Gobind Singh.The temple of Renukadevi at Mahur, considered a Shakti Peetha, is located in the Nanded district. The city also has many shrines dedicated to Sufi saints.
Parbhani: The city of Parbhani, in the Marathwada region of the state, is well known for Sufi shrine of the great saint Shah Turabul Haq. The annual two week fair in the honour of the saint in February attracts around half a million pilgrims to the city. Because of its popularity within Maharashtra, it is often called as Ajmer Sharif of Maharashtra.
The Statue of Ahimsa, a 108 ft idol of first Jain tirthankara Rishabhanatha carved in monolithic stone was consecrated at Mangi Tungi in February 2016. It is recorded in the Guinness Book of World Records as the tallest Jain idol in the world. It has become a major pilgrimage and tourist destination.
Pune, Osho International Meditation Resort. It attracts visitors from other parts of India and abroad.

Kumbhoj 

Kumbhoj is the name of an ancient town located in Kolhapur district, Maharashtra. The town is about eight kilometers from Hatkanangale, about twenty seven kilometers from Kolhapur.

Gallery

References 

Kundalika River Rafting- River Rafting in Kundalika River in Maharashtra

External links 

 Official Website of Maharashtra Tourism Development Corporation

 
Maharashtra